Hélène Geoffroy (born 4 March 1970) is a French politician who was elected to the French National Assembly on 17 June 2012 representing the department of Rhône.

References

1970 births
Living people
Black French politicians
People from Creil
French people of Guadeloupean descent
Socialist Party (France) politicians
Secretaries of State of France
Mayors of places in Auvergne-Rhône-Alpes
Women members of the National Assembly (France)
Women mayors of places in France
Deputies of the 14th National Assembly of the French Fifth Republic
21st-century French women politicians
Women government ministers of France